MacKenzie Weegar (born January 7, 1994) is a Canadian professional ice hockey defenceman for the Calgary Flames in the National Hockey League (NHL). Weegar was drafted by the Florida Panthers with the 206th overall pick in the 2013 NHL Entry Draft.

Playing career
Weegar played major junior hockey with the Halifax Mooseheads in the Quebec Major Junior Hockey League. After his selection to the Panthers, Weegar was signed following his second season with the Mooseheads in 2013–14 to a three-year, entry-level deal on May 29, 2014.

Weegar turned professional during the 2014–15 AHL season, appearing in 31 games for the Panthers' AHL affiliate San Antonio Rampage. Weegar also skated in 21 games for the Cincinnati Cyclones of the ECHL.

During the final year of his entry-level deal in the 2016–17, having played primarily with the Panthers' AHL affiliates, Weegar received his first NHL recall to the NHL on April 3, 2017. He made his debut with the Panthers that night in a 4–1 defeat against the Montreal Canadiens. After three games with Florida, Weegar was returned to conclude the season with the Springfield Thunderbirds.

On August 3, 2017, the Panthers re-signed Weegar to a one-year, two-way contract.

On October 20, 2017, Weegar scored his first NHL goal against Pittsburgh Penguins' goaltender Matt Murray to tie the Panthers with the Penguins 3–3. He was subsequently re-signed to one-year, one-way contract in 2018 and 2019.

On November 6, 2020, Weegar was re-signed to a three-year contract with the Panthers.

On July 22, 2022, Weegar was included in the blockbuster trade for the Panthers along with Jonathan Huberdeau, Cole Schwindt and a conditional 2025 first-round selection to the Calgary Flames in exchange for Matthew Tkachuk and a conditional fourth-round selection in 2025.

Personal life
Weegar is the first cousin of former NHL player and current broadcaster Craig Rivet. Weegar wears uniform number 52, the same number Rivet wore during his career.

Career statistics

Awards and honours

References

External links
 

1994 births
Living people
Calgary Flames players
Canadian ice hockey forwards
Cincinnati Cyclones (ECHL) players
Florida Panthers draft picks
Florida Panthers players
Halifax Mooseheads players
Ice hockey people from Ottawa
Portland Pirates players
San Antonio Rampage players
Springfield Thunderbirds players